Karl Erik Nazarov (born Laanet, 17 March 1999) is an Estonian sprinter. Focusing on 400 metres hurdles initially, he switched to sprints in 2021. His biggest success to date is the fourth place in the 60 metres at the 2022 World Indoor Championships.

His uncle is Andrei Nazarov, a former decathlete.

International competitions

Personal bests
Outdoor
100 metres – 10.34	(+0.8 m/s, Tallinn 2022)
200 metres – 21.35	(+0.5 m/s, Espoo 2021)
400 metres hurdles – 51.32	(Jyväskylä 2020)
Indoor
60 metres – 6.55 (Belgrade 2022) NR
200 metres – 21.63	(Tallinn 2020)

References

1999 births
Living people
Estonian male sprinters

et:Karl Erik Nazarov